Henry Kirui (born 5 April 1972) is a former Kenyan middle distance runner who won a gold medal at the 1988 World Junior Championships in Sudbury in the 5000 m event.

Achievements

References

1972 births
Living people
Kenyan male long-distance runners
Kenyan male cross country runners
World Athletics Championships athletes for Kenya
World Athletics Championships medalists